Coleophora albovanescens is a moth of the family Coleophoridae. It is found in North America, including New York and Nova Scotia.

The larvae feed on the leaves of Betula, Fagus, Fraxinus and Ostrya species. They create a pistol case.

References

albovanescens
Moths described in 1926
Moths of North America